Seigfried is another spelling of Sigurd.

Seigfried may also refer to:
 Karl E. H. Seigfried
 Seigfried Line
 "Seigfried", a 2016 song by Frank Ocean from his album Blonde

See also
 Siegfried (disambiguation)